Kuzma was a racing car constructor founded by Eddie Kuzma in the United States. Kuzma cars competed in the FIA World Championship (Indy 500 only) from 1951 to 1960. They won the 1952 Indianapolis 500 with Troy Ruttman.

World Championship Indy 500 results
Note: all cars were fitted with Offenhauser engines.

References

Formula One constructors (Indianapolis only)
American Championship racing cars
American racecar constructors